The County Palatine of Durham and Sadberge, commonly referred to as County Durham or simply Durham, is a historic county in Northern England. Until 1889, it was controlled by powers granted under the Bishopric of Durham. The county and Northumberland are also traditionally known together as Northumbria.

The boundaries stretch between the rivers Tyne and Tees. It borders four counties: Northumberland to the north, Yorkshire to the south as well as Westmorland and Cumberland to the west. Settlements with the most population in the county are Sunderland, Gateshead and Darlington.

During the Middle Ages, the county was an ecclesiastical centre due to the presence of St Cuthbert's shrine in Durham Cathedral. Durham Castle and Cathedral are UNESCO-designated World Heritage Sites. The county has a mixture of mining and farming heritage. Railway heritage is notable in the south of the county; Darlington, Shildon and Stockton.

History

Liberty of the Haliwerfolc

The territory was originally the Liberty of Durham under the control of the Bishop of Durham. The liberty was also known variously as the "Liberty of St Cuthbert's Land", "The lands of St. Cuthbert between Tyne and Tees" or "The Liberty of Haliwerfolc".

The bishops' special jurisdiction was based on claims that King Ecgfrith of Northumbria had granted a substantial territory to St Cuthbert on his election to the see of Lindisfarne in 684. In about 883, a cathedral housing the saint's remains was established at Chester-le-Street and Guthfrith, King of York granted the community of St Cuthbert the area between the Tyne and the Wear. In 995 the see was moved again to Durham.

During the medieval period, St Cuthbert became politically important in defining the identity of the people living in the semi-autonomous region. Within this area the saint became a powerful symbol of the autonomy the region enjoyed. The inhabitants of the Palatinate became known as the haliwerfolc, which roughly translates as "people of the saint", and Cuthbert gained a reputation as being fiercely protective of his domain. 

The Liberty of Durham enjoyed the "highest liberty in private hands" during the Middle Ages. In England, "liberty" usually meant a territorial area that was, in some sense, free from royal jurisdiction. Most of these territorial liberties extended as far back as the Anglo-Saxon period.

Previously a liberty of the Earldom of Northumberland, the wapentake of Sadberge was purchased by bishop Hugh de Puiset in 1189 and gradually incorporated into the County Palatine; it retained separate assizes until 1586.

County recognition
Durham city was captured by a Norman army in 1069. There was a rebellion against the new Norman earl Robert de Comines, who was killed. However, County Durham largely missed the Harrying of the North that was designed to subjugate such rebellions. The best remains of the Norman period are to be found in Durham Cathedral and in the castle, also in some few parish churches, as at Pittington and Norton in Stockton. Of the Early English period are the eastern portion of the cathedral, the churches of Darlington, Hartlepool, and St Andrew, Auckland, Sedgefield, and portions of a few other churches.

The prior of Durham ranked first among the bishop's barons. He had his own court, and almost exclusive jurisdiction over his men. There were ten palatinate barons in the 12th century, the most important being the Hyltons of Hylton Castle, the Bulmers of Brancepeth, the Conyers of Sockburne, the Hansards of Evenwood, and the Lumleys of Lumley Castle.

Following the Norman invasion, the administrative machinery of government was only slowly extended to northern England. In the twelfth century a county of Northumberland was formed, Durham was considered to be within its bounds even when the liberty had an exchequer.

The authority of the sheriff of Northumberland and his officials was disputed by the bishops.  The crown still regarded Durham as falling within Northumberland until the late thirteenth century. Matters came to a head in 1293 when the bishop and his steward failed to attend proceedings of quo warranto held by the justices of Northumberland. The bishop's case was heard in Parliament, where he stated that Durham lay outside the bounds of any English shire and that "from time immemorial it had been widely known that the sheriff of Northumberland was not sheriff of Durham nor entered within that liberty as sheriff... nor made there proclamations or attachments". 

The bishop's arguments appear to have been accepted, as by the fourteenth century Durham was accepted as a liberty which received royal mandates direct. In effect it was a private shire, with the bishop appointing his own sheriff. An assembly represented the whole palatine, and dealt chiefly with fiscal questions. The bishop's council, consisting of the clergy, the sheriff and the barons, regulated the judicial affairs, and later produced the Chancery and the courts of Admiralty and Marshalsea. The term palatinus is also applied to the bishop in 1293, and from the 13th century onwards the bishops frequently claimed the same rights in their lands as the king enjoyed in his kingdom. The area eventually became known as the "County Palatine of Durham".

Early administration

As a palatinate under ecclesiastical jurisdiction the Bishop of Durham enjoyed exemption from taxation and the right to pardon life and limb. Both Bracton and Blackstone considered the "right to pardon life and limb"  the "essential mark" of a palatinate. It was divided by the 13th century into four "wards" named, after its chief towns, Chester-le-Street, Darlington, Easington and Stockton. Each had its own coroner and a three-weekly court. Edward I's quo warranto proceedings of 1293 showed twelve lords enjoying more or less extensive franchises under the bishop. 

At the Battle of Neville's Cross in 1346, the Prior of the Abbey at Durham received a vision of Cuthbert, ordering him to take the corporax cloth of the saint and raise it on a spear point near the battlefield as a banner. Doing this, the Prior and his monks found themselves protected "by the mediation of holy St Cuthbert and the presence of the said holy Relic." Whether the story of the vision is true or not, the banner of St Cuthbert was regularly carried in battle against the Scots until the Reformation, and it serves as a good example of how St Cuthbert was regarded as a protector of his people. The Nevilles owned large estates in the county. Raby Castle, their principal seat, was rebuilt by John Neville, 3rd Baron Neville de Raby in 1377.

During the Wars of the Roses, Henry VI passed through Durham. Until the 15th century the most important administrative officer in the palatinate was the steward. Other officers were the sheriff, the coroners, the chamberlain and the chancellor. 

The repeated efforts of the Crown to check the powers of the palatinate bishops culminated in 1536 in the Act of Resumption, which deprived the bishop of the power to pardon offences against the law or to appoint judicial officers. Moreover, indictments and legal processes were in future to run in the name of the king, and offences to be described as against the peace of the king, rather than that of the bishop. In 1596 restrictions were imposed on the powers of the chancery. In 1614 a bill was introduced in Parliament for securing representation to the county and city of Durham and the borough of Barnard Castle. The movement was strongly opposed by the bishop, as an infringement of his palatinate rights. 

On the outbreak of the Great Rebellion Durham inclined to support the cause of Parliament, and in 1640 the high sheriff of the palatinate guaranteed to supply the Scottish army with provisions during their stay in the county. In 1642 the Earl of Newcastle formed the western counties into an association for the King's service, but in 1644 the palatinate was again overrun by the Scottish army, and after the Battle of Marston Moor fell entirely into the hands of Parliament.

In 1646 the palatinate was formally abolished, the county first summoned to return members to Parliament in 1654. After the Restoration in 1660, both county and Durham city returned two members each and the palatine re-established.

Prince-bishopric abolished

At its historic extent, Durham includes a main body covering the Catchment of the Pennines in the west, the River Tees in the south, the North Sea in the east and the Rivers Tyne and Derwent in the north. The county had a number of exclaves: Bedlingtonshire, Islandshire and Norhamshire within Northumberland, and Craikshire within the North Riding of Yorkshire.

The boundaries were used for parliamentary purposes until 1832, and for judicial and local government purposes until the coming into force of the Counties (Detached Parts) Act 1844, which merged most remaining exclaves with their surrounding county. By the Reform Act of 1832 the county returned two members for two divisions, and the boroughs of Gateshead, South Shields and Sunderland acquired representation. 

The county paltine continued with much the same power until 5 July 1836, when the Durham (County Palatine) Act 1836 provided that the palatine jurisdiction should in future be vested in the Crown. Doubts about the construction of this Act led to the enactment of the Durham County Palatine Act 1858.

The Durham County Palatine Acts 1836 to 1889 was the collective title of the Durham (County Palatine) Act 1836, the Durham County Palatine Act 1858, the Durham Chancery Act 1869 and the Palatine Court of Durham Act 1889.
 The Court of the County of Durham was abolished by section 2 of the Durham (County Palatine) Act 1836.
 The Court of Pleas of the County Palatine of Durham and Sadberge, abolished by the Supreme Court of Judicature Act 1873.

The boroughs of Darlington, Stockton and Hartlepool returned one member each from 1868 until the Redistribution Act of 1885. The Court of Chancery of the County Palatine of Durham and Sadberge abolished by the Courts Act 1971.

Culture

Mining and heavy industry 

A substantial number of colliery villages were built throughout the county in the nineteenth century to house the growing workforce, which included large numbers of migrant workers from the rest of the UK. Sometimes the migrants were brought in to augment the local workforce but, in other cases, they were brought in as strike breakers, or "blacklegs". Tens of thousands of people migrated to County Durham from Cornwall (partly due to their previous experience of tin mining) between 1815 and the outbreak of the First World War, so much so that the miners' cottages in east Durham called "Greenhill" were also known locally as "Cornwall", and Easington Colliery still has a Cornish Street. Other migrants included people from Northumberland, Cumberland, South Wales, Scotland and Ireland. Coal mining had a profound effect on trade unionism, public health and housing, as well as creating a related culture, language, folklore and sense of identity that still survives today.

The migrants also were employed in the railway, ship building, iron, steel and roadworking industries, and the pattern of migration continued, to a lesser extent, up until the 1950s and 1960s. Gateshead was once home to the fourth-largest Irish settlement in England, Consett's population was 22% Irish and significant numbers of Irish people moved to Sunderland, resulting in the city hosting numerous events on St. Patrick's Day due to the Irish heritage.

The culture of coal mining found expression in the Durham Miners' Gala, which was first held in 1871, developed around the culture of trade unionism. Coal mining continued to decline and pits closed. The UK miners' strike of 1984/5 caused many miners across the county to strike. Today no deep-coal mines exist in the county and numbers attending the Miners' Gala decreased over the period between the end of the strike and the 21st century. However recent years have seen numbers significantly grow, and more banners return to the Gala each year as former colliery communities restore or replicate former banners to march at the Gala parade.

Art 
In 1930, the Spennymoor Settlement (otherwise known as the Pitman's Academy) opened. The settlement, initially funded by the Pilgrim Trust, aimed to encourage people to be neighbourly and participate in voluntary social service. The settlement operated during the Great Depression, when unemployment was widespread and economic deprivation rife; Spennymoor was economically underprivileged. The settlement provided educational and social work, as well as hope; this included providing unemployed miners with on outlet for their creativity, a poor person's lawyer service, the town's first library and the Everyman Theatre. The output included paintings, sewing, socially-significant plays, woodwork and sculptures. Several members went on to win adult scholarships at Oxford University when such a route would normally be closed to the underprivileged. Former members include artists Norman Cornish and Tom McGuinness, writer Sid Chaplin OBE and journalist Arnold Hadwin OBE. The Spennymoor Settlement at its home in the Everyman Theatre (Grade 2 listed) is still operating, administered by the current trustees, offering community events and activities, including Youth Theatre Group, an Art Group and various classes, as well as offering community accommodation facilities.

Several Durham miners have been able to turn their former mining careers into careers in art. For example, Tom Lamb, as well as the aforementioned Tom McGuinness and Norman Cornish. Their artworks depict scenes of life underground, from the streets in which they lived and of the people they loved; through them, we can see, understand and experience the mining culture of County Durham.

In 2017, The Mining Art Gallery opened in Bishop Auckland in a building that was once a bank. Part of the Auckland Project, the gallery includes the work of artists from within County Durham and beyond, including such other North-Eastern mining artists as Robert Olley, as well as contributions from outside the region. It features three permanent areas and a temporary exhibition area; the gallery's Gemini Collection includes 420 pieces of mining art.  Much of the artwork was donated, by Dr Robert McManners and Gillian Wales, for example.

In 2019, 100 years after his birth, a permanent tribute to the work of the artist Norman Stansfield Cornish MBE was opened within the Town Hall, and a Cornish Trail around the town was established to include areas of the town depicted in Cornish's artwork.

Music 
As with neighbouring Northumberland, County Durham has a rich heritage of Northumbrian music, dating back from the Northumbrian Golden Age of the 7th and 8th centuries. Bede made references to harp-playing, and abundant archeological evidence has been found of wooden flutes, bone flutes, panpipes, wooden drums and lyres (a six-string form of harp). North-East England has a distinctive folk music style that has drawn from many other regions, including southern Scotland, Ireland and the rest of northern England, that has endured stably since the 18th century. Instruments played include, in common with most folk music styles, stringed instruments such as the guitar and fiddle, but also the Northumbrian smallpipe, which is played and promoted by people including the Northumbrian Pipers' Society throughout the North East, including County Durham, with the society having an active group in Sedgefield. Contemporary folk musicians include Jez Lowe and Ged Foley.

In 2018, The Arts Council funded the Stories of Sanctuary project in the city of Durham. The project aims to assist people living in the city to share their stories about seeking sanctuary in the North East through photography, stories, poetry and music. The art is based on a history of sanctuary in Durham, from St Cuthbert's exile, through to the miners' strike of 1984, and to refugees escaping civil war in the Middle East. The music produced as part of the project includes contributions from singer-songwriter Sam Slatcher and viola player Raghad Haddad from the National Syrian Orchestra.

Other notable performers/songwriters who were born or raised in the county include Paddy McAloon, Eric Boswell, Jeremy Spencer, Alan Clark, Martin Brammer, Robert Blamire, Thomas Allen, Zoe Birkett, John O'Neill, Karen Harding and Courtney Hadwin.

Flag 

County Durham has its own flag, registered with the Flag Institute on 21 November 2013.

Katie, Holly and James Moffatt designed the flag and entered their design into a competition launched by campaigner Andy Strangeway, who spoke of the flag as "free, public symbol for all to use, especially on 20th March each year, which is not only County Durham Day but also St. Cuthbert’s birthday.”  [sic - 20th March is actually the date of Cuthbert's death] 

The flag consists of St Cuthbert's cross counterchanged with the county's blue and gold colours.

Landmarks

Sport

Cricket

Durham Cricket represent the historic county in the domestic first class cricket County Championship; with 3 championship titles. The two amateur ECB Premier Leagues in the county are North East Premier League and NYSD Cricket League.

Durham County Cricket Club formed in 1882. After years of success in the Minor Counties Championship, Durham was accepted into the senior counties championship in 1992. The Riverside cricket ground regularly hosts international cricket; its first "Ashes" Test Match between England and Australia was in August 2013. With 320 runs and 15 wickets on the last day of the match, the venue provided "the most high-octane day of a thrilling Test match", and England took an unassailable 3-0 lead against the Australians in the five-match Ashes Test series.

Association football
Male league football clubs founded in County Durham include:

Below the Northern Premier League, is the Northern Football League. At county-level, the area is governed by the Durham County Football Association. The next step down, after the NFL, play in the Northern Football Alliance or the North Riding Football League. The system is then multiple Sunday or Saturday leagues. Female league football clubs in the county include; Durham, Middlesbrough (play in Billingham) and Sunderland.

Heritage

A precursor of modern football is the Sedgefield Ball Game which has been a long standing tradition. Sunderland Association Football Club was formed in 1879. Darlington formed in 1861 (re-formed 1883 and in 2012) and West Hartlepool of 1881 became Hartlepool United in 1908. Sunderland was rivalled by a break-away team called Sunderland Albion, which were lost before the 20th century began. Sunderland won the league championship three times in the 1890s.

Today top quality professional football remains in County Durham. In 2017–18 season, Sunderland were in the Football League Championship, Hartlepool and Gateshead FC compete in the National League. The Stadium of Light in Sunderland is a first class football venue is used for some international games at every levels.

Amateur and semi-professional football clubs like Bishop Auckland has had success and public attention through its Football Association Cup runs, but the most famous achievement was by West Auckland Town FC in 1910: they were invited to take part in a competition in Italy to compete for what was then labelled the soccer World Cup. West Auckland won the competition against some of Europe's biggest sides; they defeated the mighty Juventus 2–0 in the final. They even successfully defended the title the following year. The first World Cup trophy played for in these tournaments, Sir Thomas Lipton Trophy, has an interesting history of its own. In January 1994 the trophy, which was being held in West Auckland Working Men's Club, was stolen and never recovered. An exact replica of the original trophy was commissioned and is now held by West Auckland FC. The story of West Auckland's success was made into a film called "A Captain's Tale", starring actor Dennis Waterman as club captain Jones.

Players from some of the counties minor league teams have gone on to influence football on the world stage. Jack Greenwell (John Richard Greenwell), an ex-coal miner who played non-league football for Crook Town A.F.C. from 1901 to 1912, went to Spain and played 88 games for Barcelona before becoming their manager in 1917. Greenwell's achievements at Barcelona include winning five Catalan championships and two Copas del Rey. He also managed Espanyol, Mallorca and Valencia. On the outbreak of the Spanish Civil War, he moved to South America to manage the Peruvian and Colombian national teams; he died in 1942 in Bogotá.

Notable footballers
There are many notable footballers from the county of Durham . Sunderland's Alf Common became the world's first £1,000 player when he was signed by Middlesbrough in 1905. Other pre Second World War and immediate post war greats were Charlie Buchan, who created and edited the iconic magazine "Football Monthly", George Camsell, Hughie Gallacher, Raich Carter, Bobby Gurney all of whom are described in a famous book by the "Clown Prince of Football" Len Shackleton. Shackleton's book shot to immediate fame and caused a storm when first published because chapter 9, named "The Average Director's Knowledge of Football", was produced as a blank page. After the Second World War notable footballers included Joe Harvey (Crook manager from 1954–1955), Brian Clough, and Sunderland goalkeeper Jim Montgomery, who helped the then Second Division club Sunderland beat Leeds United to win the 1973 FA Cup Final.

Rugby Union

Rugby union teams based in Durham County:

The Durham County RFU is affiliated with the Durham/Northumberland divisions.

Horse racing

Sedgefield Racecourse is the only operating course in the county. Early races were mentioned in 1613 at Woodham near Aycliffe. Georgian races were held at places like Barnard Castle, Bishop Auckland, Blaydon, Chester-le-Street, Darlington, Durham, Gateshead, Hebburn, Heighington, Lanchester, Ryton, Sedgefield, Shincliffe, South Shields, Stockton, Sunderland, Tanfield, Whickham and Witton Gilbert. A 1740 Act banned smaller meetings but some meetings like Durham survived into the late 19th or early 20th centuries. Horse racing is still takes place at Sedgefield Racecourse.

Golf

There is one old links course in the county at Seaton Carew, which opened in 1874. The Seaton Carew Golf Club was the only course in the whole of Durham and Yorkshire, it was therefore originally called the Durham and Yorkshire Golf Club, a reference to this today remains in the Club's badge. Seaton Carew is the 10th oldest Golf Club in England. The Club was set up by a newly qualified surgeon from Edinburgh, who played at Musselburgh, when he realised there was nowhere for him to continue to practice his passion for the game. This was Dr. Duncan McCuaig, after qualifying at University of Edinburgh. His memory can be recalled when one plays the third hole, a challenging par 3, named "The Doctor". Over the years some of the finest golfers in the country have played the links at Seaton Carew, including the legendary "Great Triumvirate" of Golf Harry Vardon, John Henry "J H" Taylor and James Braid and several other Open Champions.

Dr Alister MacKenzie, the designer of Augusta National Golf Club in Augusta, Georgia, home of The Masters, and the Cypress Point golf course in California, lengthened the Seaton Carew Course in 1925 to 6,500 yards and designed new holes eastwards including the planting of over 2,000 buckthorn bushes. In 1937, Walter Hagen played an exhibition match at Seaton Carew during a tour of Europe and commented "It is a splendid course, the links are well groomed. It is not an easy course and provides a good test of golf. It is one I would like to play quite often". This Club by varying the playing sequence of the 22 holes can create 5 different course layouts. In 2014, "flyovers" of all 5 Seaton Carew Golf Course layouts were created with commentaries by TV commentator Peter Alliss. Alliss comments: "The tenth oldest in England and a true championship links to challenge all levels of players."

Seaton Carew Golf Club is regular host to top amateur golf competitions. Golf England's Brabazon Trophy was held at this Club in 1985 and the winner, Peter Baker, went on to Ryder Cup and European Tour success after sharing this amateur title with the North East's Roger Roper (Roper turned professional at the age of 50 in 2007 to compete on the Seniors Professional Tour). In June 2014, The Brabazon Trophy tournament returned to Seaton Carew and in line with the illustrious outcomes for past winners on this course a bright future is predicted for the winner Ben Stow from Wiltshire. Stow equalled the course record on the final day with a "birdie" on the final hole to win the Barabzon Trophy by one shot.

They is multiple inland golf courses  in the county, those courses created in the late 20th and early 21st centuries are Brancepeth Golf Club, Wynyard, Rockciffe Hall, Slalely Hall  and Close House have an international reputation and regularly hold professional events such as the Seve Trophy and the Seniors Tour. Graeme Storm from Hartlepool has won events on the European Tour.

Athletics
Athletics in the county has had olympic and international success of athletes Brendan Foster in the 1970s and Steve Cram in the 1980s. Both won international medals and broke world records in middle and long distance running. Brendan Foster established the annual Great North Run, one of the best known half marathons in which thousands of participants run from Newcastle to South Shields. Brendan Foster, a former school teacher in this region, is also recognised as the driving force behind the creation of the Gateshead International Athletics Stadium which now regularly hosts International Athletics meets and other sporting events.

In 2013 the 33rd Great North Run had 56,000 participants most of whom were raising money for charity. The elite races had Olympic gold medalists and world champion long distance runners participateing including in the men's race, Mo Farah, Kenenisa Bekele and a regular supporter of the event Haile Gebrselassie. Ethiopian Bekele won the men's event just ahead of Farah. Kenya's Priscah Jeptoo came first the women's race and multi Olympic gold medalist David Weir won the wheelchair event. The 2014 Great North Run had its millionth finisher – becoming the first International Athletics Association Event (IAAF) event in the world to reach such a milestone. The 2014 Great North Run also saw Mo Farah win the men's race in an hour. The millionth finisher was a Tracey Cramond of Darlington. 51 year old Tracey ran the race to raise funds for Butterwick Hospice.

Economy

Economic history

County Durham has long been associated with coal mining, from medieval times up to the late 20th century. The Durham Coalfield covered a large area of the county, from Bishop Auckland, to Consett, to the River Tyne and below the North Sea, thereby providing a significant expanse of territory from which this rich mineral resource could be extracted.

King Stephen possessed a mine in Durham, which he granted to Bishop Pudsey, and in the same century colliers are mentioned at Coundon, Bishopwearmouth and Sedgefield. Cockfield Fell was one of the earliest Landsale collieries in Durham. Richard II granted to the inhabitants of Durham licence to export the produce of the mines, the majority being transported from the Port of Sunderland complex which was constructed in the 1850s.

Among other early industries, lead-mining was carried on in the western part of the county, and mustard was extensively cultivated. Gateshead had a considerable tanning trade and shipbuilding was undertaken at Sunderland, which became the largest shipbuilding town in the world – constructing a third of Britain's tonnage.

The county's modern-era economic history was facilitated significantly by the growth of the mining industry during the nineteenth century. At the industry's height, in the early 20th century, over 170,000 coal miners were employed, and they mined 58,700,000 tons of coal in 1913 alone. As a result, a large number of colliery villages were built throughout the county as the industrial revolution gathered pace.

The railway industry was also a major employer during the industrial revolution, with railways being built throughout the county, such as The Tanfield Railway, The Clarence Railway and The Stockton and Darlington Railway. The growth of this industry occurred alongside the coal industry, as the railways provided a fast, efficient means to move coal from the mines to the ports and provided the fuel for the locomotives. The great railway pioneers Timothy Hackworth, Edward Pease, George Stephenson and Robert Stephenson were all actively involved with developing the railways in tandem with County Durham's coal mining industry. Shildon and Darlington became thriving 'railway towns' and experienced significant growths in population and prosperity; before the railways, just over 100 people lived in Shildon but, by the 1890s, the town was home to around 8,000 people, with Shildon Shops employing almost 3000 people at its height.

However, by the 1930s, the coal mining industry began to diminish and, by the mid-twentieth century, the pits were closing at an increasing rate. In 1951, the Durham County Development Plan highlighted a number of colliery villages, such as Blackhouse, as 'Category D' settlements, in which future development would be prohibited, property would be acquired and demolished, and the population moved to new housing, such as that being built in Newton Aycliffe. Likewise, the railway industry also began to decline, and was significantly brought to a fraction of its former self by the Beeching cuts in the 1960s. Darlington Works closed in 1966 and Shildon Shops followed suit in 1984. The county's last deep mines, at Easington, Vane Tempest, Wearmouth and Westoe, closed in 1993.

Post markings
Postal Rates from 1801 were charged depending on the distance from London. Durham was allocated the code 263 the approximate mileage from London. From about 1811, a datestamp appeared on letters showing the date the letter was posted. In 1844 a new system was introduced and Durham was allocated the code 267. This system was replaced in 1840 when the first postage stamps were introduced.

Demography

Employment
The proportion of the population working in agriculture fell from around 6% in 1851 to 1% in 1951; currently less than 1% of the population work in agriculture. There were 15,202 people employed in coal mining in 1841, rising to a peak of 157,837 in 1921.

Exclaves

Throughout the 1800s exclaves of the historic county were given to surrounding shires and lands they were closer associated with:
 Yorkshire (East Riding): Howdenshire
 Yorkshire (North Riding): Allertonshire
 Northumberland: Bedlingtonshire, Islandshire (included Berwick-upon-Tweed)

References

History of County Durham
Prince-bishoprics
Counties of England established in antiquity